This is a list of notable job scheduler software.  Job scheduling applications are designed to carry out repetitive tasks as defined in a schedule based upon calendar and event conditions.  This category of software is also called workload automation. Only products with their own article are listed:

 Apache Airflow
Cron
 DIET
HTCondor
Maui Cluster Scheduler
 OpenLava
 OpenPBS 
 Oracle Grid Engine
Platform LSF
 ProActive
 Quartz
 Slurm Workload Manager
 Systemd 
 Univa Grid Engine
 VisualCron
 Windows Task Scheduler
 AutoSys from Broadcom
 Control-M scheduler from BMC_Software

Lists of software